Bumaji is a Bendi language of Nigeria.

References

Bendi languages
Languages of Nigeria